El Hombre Misteroso is a Peruvian rock band formed in 2002 by Santiago Pillado (vocals, drums), Rodrigo Ráez (guitar, backing vocals), José Luis Salomón (bass guitar) and Fernando Salomón (percussion) in Lima, Peru. The band released their first album "Pez Raro" on 2004 and that same year Richard Gutiérrez joined to establish the band and record their next three albums: "The Achorado Sound of El Hombre Misterioso" (2008), "Inside The Corporation" (2009) and "Ausencia" (2013).

Discography 

 Pez Raro (2004)
 The Achorado Sound Of El Hombre Misterioso (2008)
 Inside The Corporation (2009)
Ausencia (2013)
 El Hombre Misterioso (2016)

Music videos

 La Luna Houston Texas (2009)
 Sabia Virtud (2016)

References

External links 
 

Peruvian rock music groups
Peruvian alternative rock groups
Musical groups established in 2002